Susan Carol McDougal (née Henley; born 1955) is a real estate investor who served prison time as a result of the Whitewater controversy.

Her refusal to answer "three questions" for a grand jury, on whether President Bill Clinton lied in his testimony during her Whitewater trial, led her to receive a jail sentence of 18 months for contempt of court. That made up most of the total 22 months she spent incarcerated.

She received a full presidential pardon from Clinton in the final hours of his presidency in 2001.

Early life
McDougal was born as Susan Carol Henley in Heidelberg, West Germany, the daughter of James B. Henley and Laurette (Mathieu) Henley. In 1976, Susan married Jim McDougal. The McDougals were partners with President Bill Clinton and Hillary Clinton in the failed Whitewater controversy real estate venture in the 1980s.

McDougal separated from her husband in the late 1980s and moved to Los Angeles, California. There, from 1989 to 1992, she worked in Los Angeles as a personal assistant to former actress Nancy Kovack, the wife of conductor Zubin Mehta. In late 1993, McDougal was charged with embezzling money from the Mehtas and began preparing her successful defense against the charges. After her release, her embezzlement trial in California began. In 1998, McDougal was acquitted on all 12 counts.

A suit in 1999 against Nancy Kovack for malicious prosecution was settled out of court.

Whitewater affair

On August 5, 1994, Kenneth Starr became Independent Counsel to prosecute McDougal and other Whitewater participants. Her federal trial began in 1996, in which the government's star witness, Arkansas banker and former municipal judge David Hale, claimed that  President Bill Clinton had discussed an illegal $300,000 loan with him and McDougal years earlier, while he was Governor of Arkansas. Hale was himself under investigation for having defrauded the SBA out of $3.2 million. He also unsuccessfully sought to have his brother Milas Hale corroborate his testimony against Clinton.

McDougal was convicted of her role in Whitewater on May 28, 1996, and was sentenced to spend time in prison for four counts of fraud and conspiracy relating to the Whitewater scandal, but her prison term did not begin until March 7, 1998, as there were other court proceedings. Following her ex-husband's James (Jim) B. McDougal's conviction but prior to his sentencing, he began to co-operate with the Office of Independent Counsel and tried to persuade her to do likewise to avoid a prison sentence.

Susan's defense lawyer, Mark Geragos, stated that her ex-husband told her that Deputy Independent Counsel W. Hickman Ewing Jr. would be able to "get Clinton with a sex charge" before the 1996 election if she agreed to lie and say she had had an affair with Clinton. She has always denied ever having had an affair with Clinton.

Ewing denied to reporters, during a break in the proceedings, that he had ever heard of such a plan: "I never talked to Jim McDougal about that, and I wouldn't. I never heard any discussion along those lines in my office ever at the time frame she's talking about."

Rejecting her ex-husband's advice, McDougal's sentencing hearing began August 19, 1996. After the judge levied a sentence of two years in federal prison but before she left the courtroom, Starr had her served with a subpoena for another Whitewater grand jury, to begin two weeks later.

Grand jury
During the grand jury, McDougal stated her full name "for the record" and then refused to answer any questions. In her book, she explained, "I feared being accused of perjury if I told the grand jury the truth. The OIC had accepted David Hale's lies as the truth. They were also now relying on Jim McDougal's lies, which they'd carefully helped him construct. If I came in and directly contradicted those two – whose testimony had been used to convict me of four felonies – I feared the OIC would next accuse me of perjury." She also writes that she feared the same fate as Julie Hiatt Steele, who had contradicted the testimony of White House aide Kathleen Willey: "Simply telling the truth cost Steele everything she had, almost landed her in jail [for perjury], and jeopardized her custody of her adopted son."

McDougal's grand jury testimony included her response: "Get another independent counsel and I'll answer every question." She was publicly rebuked for refusing to answer "three questions" about whether President Clinton had lied in his testimony during her Whitewater trial, particularly when he denied any knowledge of an illegal $300,000 loan. U.S. District Court Judge Susan Webber Wright sentenced her for civil contempt of court.

Prison
From September 9, 1996, to March 6, 1998, McDougal spent the maximum possible 18 months' imprisonment for civil contempt, including eight months in solitary confinement, and she was subjected to "diesel therapy," described by McDougal as "the practice of hauling defendants around the country and placing them in different jails along the way."

McDougal was shuffled from Arkansas to Los Angeles to the Oklahoma City transfer center, and then on to the Pulaski County Jail in Little Rock, Arkansas.

Following her release on March 7, 1998, for civil contempt of court, McDougal began serving the two-year sentence for her 1996 conviction.

Soon afterward, the Independent Counsel indicted McDougal on criminal charges of contempt of court and obstruction of justice. After serving four months on the Whitewater fraud conviction, she was released for medical reasons.

After McDougal's release, her embezzlement trial in California began. In 1998, McDougal was acquitted on all 12 counts.<ref>{{cite web|work=CNN|date= November 23, 1998 |url=http://www.cnn.com/ALLPOLITICS/stories/1998/11/23/mcdougal/ |title=Jury finds McDougal not guilty of all charges|access-date=2008-01-01 |url-status=dead |archive-url=https://web.archive.org/web/20080323053143/http://www.cnn.com/ALLPOLITICS/stories/1998/11/23/mcdougal/ |archive-date=2008-03-23 }}</ref>

A suit in 1999 against Nancy Mehta for malicious prosecution was settled out of court.

McDougal's trial for criminal charges of contempt of court and obstruction of justice began in March 1999. The jury deadlocked 7–5 in her favor on the charge of contempt of court and found her not guilty on the charge of obstruction of justice. In 2001, in the final hours of his presidency, President Clinton granted McDougal a full presidential pardon.

Recent life
Following prison, she became an advocate for prison reform. She served as a chaplain of the University of Arkansas for Medical Sciences (UAMS) in Little Rock.

See also
List of people pardoned by Bill ClintonThe Hunting of the President''

References

External links
“Womemories” - Susan McDougal - 10-minute extract from a one-hour interview from December, 2004.
“Memories” meets Susan McDougal - Hour interview with Susan McDougal from December, 2004.
"The trials and tribulations of Susan McDougal" CNN.com - April 8, 1999
Washington Post time line
"A Deal Gone Bad" CNN.com 1996

1955 births
Living people
People from Little Rock, Arkansas
Recipients of American presidential pardons
Arkansas Democrats
Whitewater controversy
Date of birth missing (living people)
Bill Clinton